The 1875 California gubernatorial election was held on September 7, 1875, to elect the governor of California.

Results

References

1875
California
gubernatorial
September 1875 events